Caramel is a 2007 Lebanese film and the feature film directorial debut of Nadine Labaki. The screenplay was co-written by Labaki with Rodney El Haddad and Jihad Hojeily.  It premiered on May 20, 2007, at the Cannes Film Festival in the Directors' Fortnight section, and was nominated for the Caméra d'Or.

The story focuses on the lives of five  Lebanese women dealing with issues such as forbidden love, binding traditions, repressed sexuality, the struggle to accept the natural process of age, and duty versus desire. Labaki's film is unique for not showcasing a war-ravaged Beirut but rather a warm and inviting locale where people deal with universal issues.

The title of the film refers to an epilation method that consists of heating sugar, water and lemon juice. Labaki also symbolically implies the "idea of sweet and salt, sweet and sour" and showcases that everyday relations can sometimes be sticky but ultimately the sisterhood shared between the central female characters prevails. Caramel was distributed in over 40 countries.

Synopsis
Caramel revolves around the intersecting lives of five Lebanese women. Layale works in a beauty salon in Beirut along with two other women, Nisrine and Rima. Layale is stuck in a dead-end relationship with a married man. Nisrine is no longer a virgin but is set to be married, and in her conservative family pre-marital sex is not acceptable. Rima is attracted to women. Jamale, a regular customer and wannabe actress, is worried about getting old. Rose, a tailoress with a shop next to the salon, is an old woman who has devoted her life to taking care of her mentally unbalanced elder sister Lili, and has found her first love.

The film does not refer to any of the political problems or recent warfare that has troubled Lebanon. Rather, Labaki's tale paints everyday people with everyday problems.

Cast
Nadine Labaki as Layale
Adel Karam as Youssef (The policeman)
Yasmine Al Massri as Nisrine
Joanna Moukarzel as Rima
Gisèle Aouad as Jamal
Sihame Haddad as Rose
Aziza Semaan as Lili (Rose's older sister)
Fatmeh Safa as Siham (mysterious lady with long hair to whom Rima gets attracted)
Ismail Antar as Bassam (Nisrine's fiancé)
Fadia Stella as Christine
Dimitri Staneofski as Charle

Production
Labaki chose to cast mostly non-professional actors.

The shooting of Caramel ended just nine days before the Israel-Lebanon war erupted in July 2006 and was released in Cannes exactly one year after the shooting began. An old clothes shop in the Gemmayzeh area of Beirut District was transformed into a salon where the filming of the movie took place. Caroline Labaki, Nadine's sister, was the costume designer. The music was composed by Khaled Mouzanar. Shortly after the movie release, Labaki married him.

Reception

Critical reception
The film received critical acclaim. , the review aggregator Rotten Tomatoes reported that 92% of critics gave the film positive reviews, based on 77 reviews with an average rating of 7.1/10. The website's critical consensus states, "Caramel is both an astute cultural study, and a charming comedic drama from a talented newcomer." Metacritic reported the film had an average score of 70 out of 100, based on 17 reviews.

Box office
As of 18 May 2008, the film has grossed a little over $1 million in the US, despite its limited release. Internationally, it has amassed a little over $14 million, making it a very profitable foreign film. It was released on DVD in the United States on 17 June 2008.

Awards and nominations
The film was Lebanon's official submission to the 80th Academy Awards for Best Foreign Language Film.

Awards
Directors' Fortnight selection 2007.
San Sebastian Film Festival Youth Award  2007.
San Sebastian Film Festival TCM Audience Award 2007.
San Sebastian Film Festival Sebastiane Award 2007.
Abu Dhabi Black Pearl for Best Actress for Nadine Labaki, Yasmine Al Massri, Joanna Moukarzel, Gisele Aouad, Siham Haddad and Asiza Semaan during the Middle east International film festival 2007.
Variety Middle East Filmmaker of the Year for Nadine Labaki during the Middle East International film festival 2007.

Nominations
Best Feature Film, Asia Pacific Screen Awards 2007.
Achievement in Directing for Nadine Labaki, Asia Pacific Screen Awards 2007.
Performance by an Actress for Nadine Labaki, Yasmine Al Massri, Joanna Moukarzel, Gisele Aouad, Siham Haddad and Aziza Semaan, Asia Pacific Screen Awards 2007.

References

External links
  
 Directors' Fortnight page on Caramel
 
 
 
 
 

2007 films
2000s Arabic-language films
2000s French-language films
2007 comedy-drama films
2007 LGBT-related films
2000s female buddy films
Lebanese LGBT-related films
Lesbian-related films
LGBT-related comedy-drama films
Lebanese comedy-drama films